Lat Phrao may refer to the following geographical features in Bangkok:

Lat Phrao District
Lat Phrao Intersection
Lat Phrao MRT station
Lat Phrao Road